Paraargyresthia is a genus of moths of the family Yponomeutidae.

Species
Paraargyresthia japonica - Moriuti, 1969

References 

 

Yponomeutidae